Kenny Dennis III is a studio album by American rapper Serengeti. It was released on Joyful Noise Recordings on November 11, 2014.

Critical reception

David Jeffries of AllMusic says, "more than any of the earlier releases, it draws upon Chicago blues and other American roots music for its beats."

Spin included it on the "40 Best Hip-Hop Albums of 2014" list. Rolling Stone placed it at number 28 on the "40 Best Rap Albums of 2014" list.

Track listing

Personnel
Credits adapted from liner notes.

 Serengeti – vocals
 Joji Kojima – vocals (2, 3, 11, 12, 18)
 Anders Holm – vocals (4, 5, 6, 7, 13, 14, 15, 16)
 Jel – drums (10), vocals (13, 16), turntables
 D.A. Fisher – guitar (12)
 Robert Brooks – cello (19)
 Odd Nosdam – production, arrangement, mixing
 Daddy Kev – mastering
 Silas – painting
 David Woodruff – layout

Charts

References

External links
 

2014 albums
Serengeti (rapper) albums
Joyful Noise Recordings albums
Albums produced by Odd Nosdam